Boletus shiyong is a species of porcini-like fungus native to Yunnan Province in Southwestern China, where it grows under Picea spp., Pinus densata, and Quercus aquifolioides. It is very closely related to Boletus quercophilus and Boletus nobilissimus; less closely to Boletus aereus.

The epiphet shiyong is the Hanyu Pinyin transcription of the fungus's Mandarin epiphet,  "edible", originally used to translate the epiphet of Boletus edulis.

References

shiyong
Fungi of China
Fungi described in 2013